Alexander Vasilyevich Alexandrov (– 8 July 1946) was a Soviet and Russian composer and founder of the Alexandrov Ensemble, who wrote the music for the State Anthem of the Soviet Union, which in 2000 became the national anthem of Russia (with new lyrics). During his career, he also worked as a professor of the Moscow Conservatory, and became a Doctor of Arts. His work was recognized by the awards of the title of People's Artist of the USSR and two Stalin Prizes.

History
Alexander Vasilyevich Alexandrov, known as Sasha, was born on 13 April 1883 in Plakhino, a village in Ryazan Governorate south-east of Moscow. As a boy, his singing was so impressive that he traveled to Saint Petersburg to become a chorister at Kazan Cathedral. A pupil of Medtner, he studied composition at Saint Petersburg and in Moscow, where he eventually became professor of music in 1918 and choirmaster at Christ the Savior from 1918 to 1922.

Alexandrov founded the Alexandrov Ensemble, and spent many years as its director, in which role he gained favor with Joseph Stalin, the country's ruler during the last two decades of Alexandrov's life. His choir participated successfully in the Universal Exposition of 1937 in Paris, and in 1942, Stalin commissioned him and lyricists Sergey Mikhalkov and Gabriel El-Registan to create a new Soviet national anthem, which was officially adopted on 1 January 1944 and was used by the Soviet Union until its collapse in 1991. It later became the National Anthem of Russia in December 2000, with Mikhalkov writing the new lyrics.

He also composed the famous song "The Sacred War", and the official march of the Soviet and now Russian Armed Forces, the Song of the Soviet Army.

His works include a number of settings of various Russian folk songs (e.g., "Utushka lugovaya").

He had a heart attack and died on 8 July 1946 at the age of 63, while on tour in Berlin; some records say he was returning from Germany.

See also

Alexandrov Ensemble
Alexandrov Ensemble choir
Alexandrov Ensemble soloists
Alexandrov Ensemble discography
Boris Alexandrovich Alexandrov

References

External links
 Geraldika biography of A.V. Alexandrov by his grandson

1883 births
1946 deaths
20th-century Russian conductors (music)
20th-century Russian male musicians
Music educators from the Russian Empire
People from Mikhaylovsky Uyezd
Communist Party of the Soviet Union members
Academic staff of Moscow Conservatory
Moscow Conservatory alumni
Honored Artists of the RSFSR
People's Artists of the USSR
Stalin Prize winners
Recipients of the Order of Lenin
Recipients of the Order of the Red Banner of Labour
Recipients of the Order of the Red Star
Choral conductors
National anthem writers
Russian major generals
Russian male composers
Russian male conductors (music)
Russian military musicians
Russian music educators
Soviet conductors (music)
Soviet major generals
Soviet male composers
Soviet music educators
Burials at Novodevichy Cemetery